Jean-Pierre Bosser may refer:

Jean-Pierre Bosser (born 1959), French army general
Jean-Pierre Bosser (born 1960), French former footballer